Chemokine (C-X-C motif) ligand 17 (CXCL17) is a small cytokine belonging to the CXC chemokine family that has been identified in humans and mice. CXCL17 attracts dendritic cells and monocytes and is regulated in tumors.  It is also known as VEGF co-regulated chemokine 1 (VCC-1) and dendritic cell- and monocyte-attracting chemokine-like protein (DMC). This chemokine is constitutively expressed in the lung. The gene for human CXCL17 is located on chromosome 19. 

CXCL17 is an orphan chemokine with no known receptor.

Receptor 
The receptor for CXCL17 is likely to be a G protein-coupled receptor (GPCR). 

The GPCR GPR35 was thought to be a receptor of CXCL17. Subsequent research has suggested that GPR35 is not a receptor for CXCL17.

References 

Cytokines